The International African Institute (IAI) was founded (as the International Institute of African Languages and Cultures - IIALC) in 1926 in London for the study of African languages. Frederick Lugard was the first chairman (1926 to his death in 1945); Diedrich Hermann Westermann (1926 to 1939) and Maurice Delafosse (1926) were the initial co-directors.

Since 1928, the IAI has published a quarterly journal, Africa. For some years during the 1950s and 1960s, the assistant editor was the novelist Barbara Pym.

The IAI's mission is "to promote the education of the public in the study of Africa and its languages and cultures". Its operations includes seminars, journals, monographs, edited volumes and stimulating scholarship within Africa.

Publications 
The IAI has been involved in scholarly publishing since 1927. Scholars whose work has been published by the institute include Emmanuel Akeampong, Samir Amin, Karin Barber, Alex de Waal, Patrick Chabal, Mary Douglas, E. E. Evans Pritchard, Jack Goody, Jane Guyer, Monica Hunter, Bronislaw Malinowski, Z. K. Matthews, D. A. Masolo, Achille Mbembe, Thomas Mofolo, John Middleton, Simon Ottenburg, J. D. Y. Peel, Mamphela Ramphele, Isaac Schapera, Monica Wilson and V. Y. Mudimbe.

IAI publications fall into a number of series, notably International African Library and International African Seminars. The International African Library is published from volume 41 (2011) by Cambridge University Press; Volumes 7–40 are available from Edinburgh University Press. , there are 49 volumes.

Archives
The archives of the International African Institute are held at the Archives Division of the Library of the London School of Economics. An online catalogue of these papers is available.

History

Africa alphabet

In 1928, the IAI (then IIALC) published an "Africa Alphabet" to facilitate standardization of Latin-based writing systems for African languages.

Prize for African-language literature, 1929–50

From April 1929 to 1950, the IAI offered prizes for works of literature in African languages.

List of chairmen

 1926–1945: Frederick Lugard, 1st Baron Lugard; first chairman
 1945–1949: Francis Rodd, 2nd Baron Rennell
 1949–1957: Sir John Waddington

Notes

External links
IAI website.

International organisations based in London
Languages of Africa
Organizations established in 1926